Shakespeare's Ghost Writers: Literature as Uncanny Causality is a nonfiction book   The book is written by Marjorie Garber and was originally published by Methuen Publishing in 1987.

Synopsis
This book decentralizes Shakespeare from his normally central position in the literary tradition. Instead the book traces the ubiquity and influence of Shakespeare's text on our culture in post-modern England and America, as well Shakespeare's textual effect on some influential minds of the twentieth century. In this way, it says, Shakespeare or Shakespeare's ghost metaphorically haunts us.

Reception
This book has received positive reviews.

Margreta de Grazia writing for the Shakespeare Quarterly says: "Shakespeare’s Ghost Writers" is a brave new book, for in justifying another new book about Shakespeare, it has attempted nothing less than to make literature newly consequential."

Jonathan Gil Harris, who wrote the book entitled Shakespeare and Literary Theory says: "[Garber's] book 'Shakespeare’s Ghost Writers'...remains the most thoughtful and thought-provoking account of Shakespeare’s ‘uncanny causality’ and the ways in which theorists, even when they criticize canonical authority, repeatedly turn to Shakespeare to lend authority to their critique. Shakespeare’s Ghost Writers was the first sustained study of ‘Shakespearean theory’; it remains the best."

References

External links

Further reading
'Shakespeare and Modern Culture.' By Marjorie Garber. (December 10, 2008). New York Times.  
 

1987 non-fiction books
American non-fiction books
Shakespearean scholarship
Literary criticism
Theatre studies
Postmodern literature
Criticism of postmodernism
English-language books